Insaf Party (Justice Party), was a Muslim political party founded by Syed Shahabuddin in 1989. It was formed as a split from the Janata Party, as a protest against the tie-up between V.P. Singh and Bharatiya Janata Party. When the V.P. Singh government fell in 1990, the Insaf Party was dissolved.

Syed Shahabuddin later revived the party, although it appears to have been disbanded again.

References

Defunct political parties in India
Political parties established in 1989
1989 establishments in India
Political parties disestablished in 1990
1990 disestablishments in India